The Guriense orogeny was a mountain building event in the Archean 2.8 to 2.7 billion years ago, preserved in the Guyana Shield rocks of Venezuela, Guyana and Suriname.

See also
Geology of Venezuela
Geology of Guyana
Geology of Suriname
List of orogenies

References

Orogenies of South America
Archean orogenies
Geology of Venezuela
Geology of Guyana
Geology of Suriname